Indians in the Netherlands are residents of Indian origin in the Netherlands. The majority of the people of Indian descent in the Netherlands are of Indo-Surinamese origin. More recently the flow of emigrants from India has increased, especially information technology professionals.

History 
In 2017, 8,630 Indians immigrated to the Netherlands, making them the second largest recent immigrant group after the Syrians. Most of them were highly skilled migrants working in information technology and information services. Moreover, the number of Indians who came to study in the Netherlands has more than tripled: from 425 migrant students in 2012 to 1,400 migrant students in 2017. Between January and November 2019, 6,322 Indians immigrated to the Netherlands. Nevertheless, Indian migrants often stay in the Netherlands temporarily, as about 45% leave the country within six years.

As of 2019, about 48,724 people of Indian immigrant descent lived in the Netherlands. Most of them live in the provinces of North Holland, South Holland and North Brabant.

Indo-Surinamese 

After the abolition of slavery in the Dutch colony of Suriname, the Dutch government signed a treaty with the United Kingdom on the recruitment of contract workers. Indians began migrating to Suriname in 1873 from what was then British India as indentured labourers, mostly from the modern-day Indian states of Uttar Pradesh, Bihar and the surrounding regions.

Up until the independence of Suriname in 1975, all the Indo-Surinamese were formally part of the Kingdom of the Netherlands and thus owned a Dutch passport. After the independence a significant portion of the Indo-Surinamese population migrated to the Netherlands, thereby retaining their Dutch passport. Currently there are more than 120,000 Indo-Surinamese living in the Netherlands, of which the majority, about 50,000, in The Hague and surroundings.

Indo-Surinamese are also known in both the Netherlands and Suriname by the Dutch term Hindoestanen, derived from the word Hindustani, lit., "someone from Hindustan". Hence, when Indians migrated to Suriname they were referred to as Hindustanis, people of Indian origin.

Statistics

In December 2001 the High Level Committee on Indian Diaspora estimated the population of PIOs and Indian citizens at 215,000. According to the Dutch governmental institution Statistics Netherlands (CBS), in January 2016, 32,682 people had their origin from immigrants from India. The Embassy of India states that the Netherlands has the "second largest population of people of Indian origin in Europe (next only to UK)" and that it is "home to about 220,000 Indian and Surinamese Hindustani Diaspora." The Netherlands India Chamber of Commerce & Trade (NICCT) states that there are about 25,000 Indians or persons of Indian origin, excluding the Surinamese Hindustanis.

Notable people 
 Rattan Chadha, businessman
 Anice Das, speed skater
 Tanja Jadnanansing, politician
 Ram Labhaya Lakhina, entrepreneur and community leader
Vinoodh Matadin, fashion photographer 
 Mangesh Panchal, cricketer
 Anil Ramdas, columnist
 Tara Singh Varma, politician
 Ricardo Kishna, footballer
 Furdjel Narsingh, footballer
 Luciano Narsingh, footballer
 Kiran Bechan, footballer

See also  
 India–Netherlands relations
 Hinduism in the Netherlands
 Indian diaspora
 Indo-Surinamese

References

External links
 Indian Diaspora in Netherlands

Asian diaspora in the Netherlands
Ethnic groups in the Netherlands
Indian diaspora in the Netherlands